In differential geometry, the Bergman metric is a Hermitian metric that can be defined on certain types of complex manifold. It is so called because it is derived from the Bergman kernel, both of which are named after Stefan Bergman.

Definition
Let  be a domain and let  be the Bergman kernel
on G. We define a Hermitian metric on the tangent bundle  by

Then the length of a tangent vector  is
given by

This metric is called the Bergman metric on G.

The length of a (piecewise) C1 curve  is
then computed as

The distance  of two points  is then defined as

The distance dG is called the Bergman distance.

The Bergman metric is in fact a positive definite matrix at each point if G is a bounded domain. More importantly, the distance dG is invariant under
biholomorphic mappings of G to another domain . That is if f

References
 Steven G. Krantz. Function Theory of Several Complex Variables, AMS Chelsea Publishing, Providence, Rhode Island, 1992.

Complex manifolds